The Colonial Hills Conference was a New Jersey high school sports association under the jurisdiction of the New Jersey State Interscholastic Athletic Association (NJSIAA). The conference comprised sixteen public, parochial, and private high schools covering Essex County, Morris County and Somerset County in north-central North Jersey.

Also known as the CHC, the conference disbanded after the 2008–09 school year as part of a major realignment of Northern New Jersey athletic leagues promulgated by the NJSIAA.  Most member schools moved to the Northwest Jersey Athletic Conference or the Super Essex Conference.

The Conference had two divisions for most sports, the Colonial Division and the Hills Division.

Colonial Division

Hills Division

External links
Colonial Hills Conference website
New Jersey State Interscholastic Athletic Association

2009 disestablishments in New Jersey
Essex County, New Jersey
Morris County, New Jersey
New Jersey high school athletic conferences
Somerset County, New Jersey